Aadil Bedi (born 17 February 2001) is an Indian professional golfer who plays on the Asian Tour and the Professional Golf Tour of India. He won the Bengal Open in 2020.

Background 
Bedi was born in Amritsar, in the state of Punjab. His father Harinder Pal Singh Bedi and mother Hargunjit Kaur are both officers with the Government of Punjab. Harinder is an avid golfer, and from the age of four, Aadil used to accompany him to play at Chandigarh Golf Club.

Bedi finished his schooling in Chandigarh at Vivek High School. He is currently pursuing a Bachelor's degree in Kinesiology from Chaffey College in California.

Amateur career 
Bedi finished at the top of the Junior Order of Merit standings in the 7–10 age group (2011), and the 11–13 age  group (2013). Notably, the latter came on the heels of winning the All India Final at Coimbatore and Bombay in November–December 2013.

As an amateur, Bedi's biggest wins came in 2017 at the SSG-BLR International Amateur Golf Championship in Singapore and the World Star of Junior Golf Championship in Las Vegas, Nevada. He was ranked as the Number 1 amateur golfer in the country by the Indian Golf Union in April/May of 2018.

Bedi was also part of the Indian team that represented India at the 2018 Asian Games. In the individual portion of the tournament, he finished T13. The team, which also included Rayhan Thomas, Kshitij Naveed Kaul, and Harimohan Singh, finished seventh overall. Thomas, Kaul and Bedi were also part of the Indian team at the 2018 Eisenhower Trophy where they finished 31st together as a team.

Professional career 

Bedi turned professional in September 2018 at the age of 17. He earned his playing rights on the domestic Professional Golf Tour of India (PGTI) in 2019 when he finished 3rd at the Finals of the qualifying school in Ahmedabad. 

Bedi won his first event as a professional on the PGTI in 2020 at the Bengal Open Championship in Kolkata at the Tollygunge Club. At the end of 72 holes of competition, Bedi tied with Udayan Mane, and beat the latter in a six-hole playoff.

He is also a full member of the Asian Tour, having earned his card through country exemptions and qualifying school in 2019. His best finish on that tour is 4th at the Classic Golf and Country Club International Championship in the same year.

Amateur wins 
 2016  Karnataka Junior Golf Championship, Northern India Junior Boys, IJGT Albatross Tournament
 2017 Western India Amateur, SSG-BLR International Amateur Championship, Las Vegas World Star of Junior Golf

Source:

Professional wins (1)

Professional Golf Tour of India wins (1)

Team appearances 
Amateur 
Eisenhower Trophy (representing India): 2018
Asian Games (representing India): 2018

Source:

References

External links 

Profile on the Indian Tour's official site

Indian male golfers
Asian Tour golfers
Golfers at the 2018 Asian Games
Punjabi people
2001 births
Living people